"Brooklyn Baby" is a song by American singer and songwriter Lana Del Rey for her third studio album Ultraviolence (2014). It was written by Del Rey, and Barrie O'Neill, while production was handled by Dan Auerbach. The song was released on June 8, 2014, by Polydor Records and Interscope Records. The song's lyrical content is notable for its satirical elements targeting the New York hipster subculture: its chorus highlights "a stable of cliches about hipsters, Brooklyn, millennials and other things Del Rey herself is known to idolize".

Composition
Miriam Coleman of Rolling Stone described Del Rey's vocals as "breathy" and called the melody of the song "reminiscent of 1960s girl-group hits". In the song, Del Rey pokes fun at New York and celebrates hipster subculture, referencing several cliches about them, Brooklyn, and Millennials. Del Rey said that she wrote the song with Lou Reed in mind. She was supposed to work with him and flew to New York City to meet him, but he died the day she arrived. He is referenced in the line "And my boyfriend's in a band/ He plays guitar while I sing Lou Reed".

Critical response
The song received critical acclaim. Miriam Coleman of Rolling Stone described it as a "dreamy song... with a breathy vocals and a melody before moving into Del Rey's typically languid, dreamy soundscape". Duncan Cooper of The Fader stated that "Brooklyn Baby" is the standout track of Ultraviolence, pointing out the "uncharacteristically self-assured gem", "Yeah, my boyfriend's pretty cool/ But he's not as cool as me.". Sharan Shetty of Slate complimented the melody of the song, however disliked the lack of "big, chewy vocal hooks". The song was placed at number twenty two on Rolling Stones 50 Best Songs of 2014 list.

Track listing
Digital download
"Brooklyn Baby" – 5:52

Personnel
Credits adapted from the liner notes of Ultraviolence.

Performance credits

Lana Del Rey – vocals, background vocals
Seth Kauffman – background vocals 

Instruments

Dan Auerbach – electric guitar
Seth Kauffman – electric guitar, percussion
Leon Michels – mellotron, tambourine, percussion, tenor saxophone
Nick Movshon – upright bass, drums
Russ Pahl – pedal steel guitar, acoustic guitar
Kenny Vaughan – acoustic guitar
Maximilian Weissenfeldt – drums

Technical and production

Dan Auerbach – production
John Davis – mastering
Collin Dupuis – engineering
Robert Orton – mixing

Charts

Certifications

Release history

References

External links

"Brooklyn Baby" lyrics at AllMusic

2014 singles
2014 songs
Interscope Records singles
Lana Del Rey songs
Satirical songs
Song recordings produced by Dan Auerbach
Songs about New York City
Songs written by Lana Del Rey
Hipster (contemporary subculture)